The F.A. Premier League Stars is a sports video game released in Europe in 1999 for Microsoft Windows and PlayStation, developed by EA UK and published by Electronic Arts.

Reception

GameSpy rated the game an 87 of 100 stating that the only people who won't like FAPLS are those who object to anything which isn't Fifa, so this game won't be too popular outside of the UK, but if it were up to me, everyone would be taught to love this game. A gem.

References

External links

1999 video games
EA Sports games
Europe-exclusive video games
PlayStation (console) games
Video games developed in the United Kingdom
Windows games